The Galician–Volhynian Chronicle, called "Halicz-Wolyn Chronicle" in Polish historiography, is a prominent benchmark of the Old Ruthenian literature and historiography covering 1201–1292 in the history of the Principality of Galicia-Volhynia (in modern Ukraine). The original chronicle did not survive; the oldest known copy is in the Hypatian Codex. It was discovered in 1809 by the Russian historian and opinion writer Nikolay Karamzin as a final part of the 15th century Hypatian Codex. He also found the second codex of the Galician–Volhynian Chronicle, the 16th century Khlebnikovsky Codex (which is considered the principle one). All six codices of the Galician–Volhynian Chronicle known today to science, including the Hypatian Codex, start from the Khlebnikovsky Codex.

The compiler of the Galician–Volhynian Chronicle explained Galicia's claim to the Principality of Kiev. The first part of the chronicle (Daniel of Galicia chronicle) was written in Kholm and possibly by a boyar Dionisiy Pavlovich.

The chronicle was published in English translation with index and annotations by George A. Perfecky. Daniel Clarke Waugh published a review of this edition, which points out some flaws in translation.

See also
 Izbornyk

References

13th-century history books
East Slavic chronicles
Halych